Robert Craigmyle Morrison, 1st Baron Morrison (29 October 1881 – 25 December 1953) was a British Labour and Co-operative politician.

Born in Aberdeen, he was the son of James Morrison. He originally worked as a schoolmaster in the Middlesex suburbs of North London. He became involved in the Labour and Co-Operative movements, and in 1914 was elected to Wood Green Urban District Council. In the same year war broke out, and he served as a private in the British Army from 1915 to 1919. In 1919 he returned to local politics when he was elected to Middlesex County Council.

At the 1922 general election, he was elected as Member of Parliament (MP) for Tottenham North.  He lost his seat at the 1931 general election to the Conservative Edward Doran, but was re-elected at the 1935 general election. After the 1924 general election, he served as Parliamentary Private Secretary to the then Leader of the Opposition Ramsay MacDonald, continuing to serve as Parliamentary Private Secretary to the Prime Minister after MacDonald's elevation to the Premiership.

On 15 November 1945, shortly after he had been re-elected at the 1945 general election, he was ennobled as Baron Morrison, of Tottenham in the County of Middlesex. In 1946, Morrison was appointed as a member of the Anglo-American Committee of Inquiry seeking a policy to resolve the increasing conflict between Jews and Arabs in Palestine. The committee then unanimously recommended a binational state in Palestine.

Morrison married Grace Glossop in 1910, and the couple had two sons. He died in a Tottenham Hospital on Christmas Day 1953, aged 72. His eldest son, Dennis Morrison, inherited his title.

References

  serving alongside Lauchlan MacNeill Weir

Morrison, Robert Craigmyle
Morrison, Robert Craigmyle
Morrison, Robert Craigmyle
Morrison, Robert Craigmyle
Morrison, Robert Craigmyle
Morrison, Robert Craigmyle
Morrison, Robert Craigmyle
Morrison, Robert Craigmyle
Morrison, Robert Craigmyle
UK MPs who were granted peerages
Parliamentary Private Secretaries to the Prime Minister
Labour Party (UK) hereditary peers
Members of the Privy Council of the United Kingdom
Members of Middlesex County Council
Ministers in the Attlee governments, 1945–1951
Barons created by George VI